The 1966 LPGA Championship was the twelfth LPGA Championship, held September 22–25 at Stardust Country Club in Las Vegas, Nevada.

Gloria Ehret won her only major title, three strokes ahead of runner-up Mickey Wright, a four-time winner of the championship. Defending champion Sandra Haynie finished nine strokes back in seventh place.

It was the last of six consecutive LPGA Championships at Stardust, which opened five years earlier. After several ownership and name changes, it became Las Vegas National Golf Club in 1998.

Past champions in the field

Source:

Final leaderboard
Sunday, September 25, 1966

Source:

References

External links
Golf Stats leaderboard
Las Vegas National Golf Club 

Women's PGA Championship
Golf in Las Vegas
LPGA Championship
LPGA Championship
LPGA Championship
LPGA Championship
Women's sports in Nevada